Not Going Quietly is a 2021 American documentary film, directed by Nicholas Bruckman and produced by Amanda Roddy, following Ady Barkan, embarking on a national campaign for healthcare reform. Mark Duplass, Jay Duplass and Bradley Whitford serve as executive producers.

It had its world premiere at South by Southwest on March 17, 2021, where it won the Special Jury Award for Humanity in Social Action and the Audience Award in the Documentary Feature Competition. It was released on August 13, 2021, by Greenwich Entertainment.

Synopsis
After being diagnosed with ALS, Ady Barkan embarks on a national campaign for healthcare reform. Barkan, Rachael King, Elizabeth Jaff, Ana Maria Archila, Nate Smith and Tracey Corder appear in the film.

Release
It had its world premiere at South by Southwest on March 17, 2021. It was scheduled to have its world premiere at the Tribeca Film Festival on April 15, 2020. However, it was cancelled due to the COVID-19 pandemic. In May 2021, Greenwich Entertainment acquired distribution rights to the film, and set it for an August 13, 2021, release. In June 2021, PBS acquired broadcast distribution rights to the film, and set it for a January 24, 2022, release as part of the series POV.

Reception
The review aggregator website Rotten Tomatoes surveyed  and, categorizing the reviews as positive or negative, assessed all 19 as positive for a 100 percent rating. Among the reviews, it determined an average rating of 8.10 out of 10. Metacritic, another aggregator, sampled eight critics and calculated a weighted average score of 76 out of 100, indicating "generally favorable reviews".

Accolades 
Not Going Quietly won The Cinema for Peace Award for The Political Film of the Year for 2022.

References

External links
 

American documentary films
Documentary films about health care
Duplass Brothers Productions films
Films postponed due to the COVID-19 pandemic
2020s English-language films
2020s American films